Jean Hubeau (22 June 191719 August 1992) was a French pianist, composer and pedagogue known especially for his recordings of Gabriel Fauré, Robert Schumann and Paul Dukas, which are recognized as benchmark versions.

Biography 
Admitted at the age of 9 years to the Conservatoire National Supérieur de Musique et de Danse de Paris, he studied composition with Paul Dukas, piano with Lazare Lévy, harmony with Jean Gallon, and counterpoint with Noël Gallon. He received first prizes in piano and in harmony in 1930 at 13 years. Aged 14 he won the first prize for accompanists, and in 1934, he received the second Prix de Rome  with his cantata The legend of Roukmani (first prize was awarded to Eugène Bozza). The following year, he was honored by Louis Diémer.

With Henry Merckel Hubeau made a highly praised recording of Mozart's violin sonata K454 in 1941.

In 1941, when Claude Delvincourt was appointed director of the Conservatoire, Hubeau was appointed to the vacancy left by Delvincourt at the head of the Music Academy in Versailles. In addition, he took the post of professor of chamber music of the Paris Conservatory from 1957 to 1982 where he trained many students such as Jacques Rouvier, Géry Moutier, Michel Dalberto, Jean-Yves Thibaudet, Olivier Charlier, Roland Daugareil, Cécilia Tsan, and Sonia Wieder-Atherton.

Landormy described Hubeau's compositional style as using a simple language, with no revolutionary intent, but displaying a freshness of invention evident in thematic material, rhythm and use of timbres.

Compositions 
The Legend of Roukmani, cantata (1934)
Concerto Héroique for piano and orchestra
Concerto for violin and orchestra in C major (1939)
Concerto for cello and orchestra in A minor (also reduction for cello and piano)
Tableaux hindous, for orchestra (1935)
La Fiancée du Diable, ballet
Trois Fables de La Fontaine, ballet
Un coeur de diamant ou l'Infante, ballet
Sonata for chromatic trumpet and piano (1943)
Violin sonata
Rondes pastorales and ballads
Humoresque Sonatina for horn, flute, clarinet and piano
Huit Rondeaux et Ballades de François Villon
Piano variations

Discography 
Trumpet and piano with Maurice André
Gabriel Fauré - Complete works for solo piano
Gabriel Fauré - Elegie Op.24, Cello Sonatas No.1 Op.109 & No.2 Op.117 (Paul Tortelier, cello)
Claude Debussy - Cello Sonata (Paul Tortelier, cello)
Camille Saint-Saëns - Works for violin and piano (Olivier Charlier, violin)
Georges Onslow - Grand Sextet, Op. 77b and Grand Septet, Op. 79
Paul Dukas - Works for piano
Jean Hubeau - Quatre Rondels de François Villon Mario Hacquard et Claude Collet

References 

1917 births
1992 deaths
Musicians from Paris
Conservatoire de Paris alumni
20th-century French composers
French male composers
20th-century French male classical pianists
Prix de Rome for composition
Erato Records artists